Supriya Aron is an Indian social worker, politician, former mayor of Bareilly, Uttar Pradesh, India, and a member of the Samajwadi Party. She is the wife of Praveen Singh Aron, a Former Member of the Lok Sabha.

Education 

Supriya Aron did a master of arts from Maharaj Singh Degree College, Saharanpur. She holds a Diploma in Journalism from Bharatiya Vidya Bhavan, New Delhi, India.

Career 

Supriya Aron started her career with Indian National Congress along with his husband, Praveen Singh Aron. In 2006, she contested for the post of Mayor in Bareilly on a Congress ticket and won.

Supriya was one of the 50 women candidates Indian National Congress announced as a part of its "Ladki Hoon, Lad Sakti Hoon" campaign.

In January 2022, just before the 18th Uttar Pradesh Assembly election, Supriya Aron left Indian National Congress and joined Samajwadi Party along with her husband, Praveen Singh Aron.

In the 2022 Uttar Pradesh Legislative Assembly election, Supriya represented Samajwadi Party as a candidate from the Bareilly Cantonment constituency and lost to Sanjeev Agarwal of the Bharatiya Janata Party by 9389 votes.

See also
Samajwadi Party
18th Uttar Pradesh Assembly
Uttar Pradesh Legislative Assembly
Bareilly Cantonment Assembly constituency

References 

Living people
21st-century Indian politicians
20th-century Indian politicians
People from Bareilly district
Samajwadi Party politicians
Year of birth missing (living people)
Samajwadi Party politicians from Uttar Pradesh